Sulfan, Sulphan, Sulfane or Sulphane may refer to:

 Sulfan (Baker & Adamson), a stabilized form of sulfur trioxide traded by Baker & Adamson
 Nisso sulfan, an alternative name for sulfur trioxide
 Sulfane (organic), a modern systematic name for the older trivial name thioether
 Sulfane/Sulphane, an alternative name for hydrogen sulfide
 , an agricultural mineral fertilizer with 24% nitrogen and 6% sulfur

See also
 Endosulfan
 Sulfanyl
 Disulfan (drug) aka Disulfiram, Tetraethylthiuramdisulfid, or Antabuse
  aka Hydrogen disulfide